The Terrible Dogfish is a dogfish-like sea monster, which appears in Carlo Collodi's 1883 book The Adventures of Pinocchio (Le avventure di Pinocchio) as the final antagonist. It is described as being larger than a five-story building, a kilometer long (not including its tail) and sporting three rows of teeth in a mouth that can easily accommodate a train. So fearsome is its reputation, that in Chapter XXXIV, it is revealed that the Dogfish is nicknamed "The Attila of fish and fishermen" (L'Attila dei pesci e dei pescatori).

In the novel 

The Dogfish is first mentioned in Chapter XXIV, when Pinocchio, searching for his creator, Geppetto, is informed by a dolphin that he has likely been swallowed by the Dogfish which "...for some days has come to wreak extermination and desolation in our waters".

The Dogfish is later mentioned in Chapter XXVI by Pinocchio's school friends on the Island of the Busy Bees (Isola delle Api Industriose), who tell him that it has been sighted on the coast, to coax him away from school.

The Dogfish makes its first appearance in Chapter XXXIV when Pinocchio, recently transformed from a donkey to his puppet form, has entered the sea to escape from his former owner. The Fairy with Turquoise Hair, in the form of a turquoise mountain goat, warns him of the Dogfish too late, and it swallows him whole, along with a tuna whom he befriends. He discovers Geppetto, who reveals that he has been trapped inside the Dogfish for two years, surviving on ship supplies swallowed by it. When it is revealed to suffer from asthma, a condition that forces it to sleep with its head raised from the water and its mouth open, Pinocchio carries Geppetto on his back and swims out of its mouth. When Pinocchio's strength begins to fail, the tuna helps them to reach the shore.

Disney version 

In the 1940 Walt Disney film Pinocchio, the Dogfish is named Monstro (which is Portuguese, Esperanto, and archaic Italian for "monster") and is portrayed as a gigantic, sadistic, terrible, aggressive, intelligent, vicious, man-eating sperm whale, in contrast with the "gentle giants of the sea" in real life, with massive jaws, both of which have sharp teeth, and a grooved underside like a rorqual. He is first mentioned by Jiminy Cricket in a message from the Blue Fairy about Geppetto, who, sailing to find Pinocchio, has been swallowed by the whale. They search for Monstro, but are frustrated upon mentioning his name to the sea creatures which causes them to flee in terror. After finally discovering Monstro sleeping, he suddenly awakens upon noticing a school of tuna swimming nearby and gives chase, eventually swallowing them and Pinocchio (except Jiminy) before closing his mouth and falling asleep again. Inside Monstro's belly, Pinocchio discovers and reunites with Geppetto before suggesting that they start a fire in order to make Monstro sneeze, the smoke of which wakes him up, prompting the whale to sneeze them out of his mouth. Unfortunately, this serves only to infuriate Monstro after drinking lots of water to put the fire out and he pursues the group, using surprise attacks in order to kill them, but fails. Eventually, when Pinocchio pulls Geppetto into a hole in a cliff, Monstro leaps into the air, aiming to reconsume the two, but ends up smashing against the rocks on impact. It is unknown what exactly happened to him, but due to smashing against the rocks, Monstro was apparently killed by the impact.

Monstro was animated by Wolfgang Reitherman, the go-to man for action sequences among Disney's Nine Old Men.

In Bonkers 
Monstro makes a guest star appearance in a Bonkers comic story titled "Whale of a Tale", published in the December 1994 issue of Disney Adventures. In this story, he is a polite actor playing a role in Pinocchio, who has not found work in the movies since then; he is duped by a gang of crooks, posing as a movie company, into breaking into banks for them to rob, and upon finding out the truth, helps Bonkers catch the criminals.

In Fantasmic! 
Monstro also plays a notable role in the Disneyland version of Fantasmic!, and also has a smaller role in the Dancing Bubbles scene in the Disney's Hollywood Studios version.

In Kingdom Hearts 
Monstro also appears in the video game Kingdom Hearts as both a supporting character and a world, where Pinocchio and Geppetto temporarily live inside him until being rescued. Within Monstro dwell many Heartless, including one called the Parasite Cage, which traps Pinocchio in its cage-like stomach, and delivers him to Riku, who wishes to use his heart to rescue Kairi. After Kingdom Hearts is sealed, Monstro presumably returns to his world.

He later reappears in Kingdom Hearts: Chain of Memories, as a figment of Sora and Riku's memories. He is not physically seen, but card rooms resembling his bowels are explored. In the Final Mix version of Kingdom Hearts: Birth by Sleep, Monstro appears as a boss fight in the Mirage Arena. He reappears as a sub-world in his homeworld, Prankster's Paradise, in Kingdom Hearts 3D: Dream Drop Distance.

Once Upon a Time 
In ABC's Once Upon a Time, Monstro makes a brief appearance in the episode "The Stranger", in which his Disney role is reiterated. Monstro's design has many similarities to the Devil Whale found in various other tales.

In Pinocchio (Walt Disney Pictures, 2022) 
In the 2022 live-action remake adaptation of Walt Disney Picture's Pinocchio (1940), Monstro plays a similar role. Unlike his animated counterpart who is a sperm whale, he is instead a monstrous, chimeric sea monster with the characteristics of whales, sharks, and cephalopods.

In the film, when Pinocchio reunites with his father Geppetto at sea after he and Jiminy Cricket escape Pleasure Island, they are suddenly ambushed and swallowed whole (except Jiminy) by Monstro, who then falls asleep. Inside the sea monster, Pinocchio suggests that he and Geppetto make Monstro sneeze. The plan works when Pinocchio uses his feet to start a fire, the smoke of which wakes Monstro up and sneezes them out of his mouth. Unfortunately, this served only to anger the sea monster and he pursues them with the intention of killing the group, but Pinocchio uses his spinning feet as propellers to get Geppetto, Figaro, Cleo and Jiminy away from the beast. Before Monstro could reconsume them when he eventually catches up to them, Pinocchio propels the boat one last time and they zoom into a nearby tunnel for safety, but Monstro runs into the cliffs and ends up smashing against them on impact. It is unknown what exactly happened to Monstro, but due to smashing against the cliffs, he was apparently killed by the impact just like in the original film.

Portrayals in other media 

 In Pinocchio (1911) directed by Giulio Antamoro, the Dogfish is depicted as a sperm whale.
 In Giuliano Cenci's 1972 animated film The Adventures of Pinocchio, the Dogfish is portrayed similarly to that of the book, but not mentioned before its initial appearance.
 In the 1984 episode of Faerie Tale Theatre, the Dogfish is represented as a gigantic orca.
 In Steve Barron's 1996 New Line Cinema live action film The Adventures of Pinocchio, the Dogfish (identified as the "sea monster") is combined with The Coachman and Mangiafuoco into the villainous Lorenzini (played by Udo Kier), who is transformed into a monstrous whale after being submerged in the cursed water which turned boys into donkeys.
 In the 2002 Italian film Pinocchio, the Dogfish is depicted as a colossal great white shark.
 In the anime manga series MÄR, Pinocchio's Guardian ARM Fastico Galleon is an enormous whale-like creature based on Monstro of the Disney film.
 The Dogfish appears in the 2012 Pinocchio film adaptation.
 In the 2019 live-action film adaptation of Pinocchio, the Dogfish is portrayed in a more faithful appearance to that of the book with more features to fit that of a sea monster.
 In the 2022 stop motion Netflix film Pinocchio that was produced, written and directed by Guillermo del Toro, the Dogfish is depicted with grotesque features such as fins belonging to anglerfish and a tail akin to kaiju.
 In the actual-play Dungeons and Dragons show Dimension 20: Neverafter, the Dogfish appears in episode 13 (Terror on Toy Island) as an enormous, whale-like monster, covered in barnacles and the broken masts of ships.

References

Bibliography 
 Collodi, Le Avventure di Pinocchio 1883, Biblioteca Universale Rizzoli

Pinocchio characters
Fictional whales
Fictional fish
Literary characters introduced in 1883
Fictional monsters
Male literary villains
Male characters in animation